The 2011 Critérium International was the 80th edition of the Critérium International cycling stage race.  It started on 26 March in Porto-Vecchio and ended on 27 March in Porto-Vecchio and consisted of 3 stages, including 2 stages on the same day; a flat stage and an individual time trial, held as the second and third stages.

The race was won by Leopard-Trek rider Fränk Schleck, who claimed the leader's yellow jersey after a strong finish in the first stage, and maintained his advantage to the end of the race. Schleck's winning margin over runner-up Vasil Kiryienka of Team Movistar was 13 seconds, and Cofidis' Rein Taaramäe completed the podium, 17 seconds down on Kiryienka.

In the race's other classifications, Kiryienka won the green jersey for the points classification, the King of the Mountains classification was won by Pim Ligthart of Vacansoleil–DCM, Taaramäe won the young rider classification, and Movistar finished at the head of the teams classification.

Pre-race favourites

The winner of the 2010 Critérium International, Pierrick Fédrigo, was looking to defend the previous year's victory, while other pre-race favourites included 2 time runner-up in the Tour de France Andy Schleck and Vuelta a España 5th place, Fränk Schleck, as well as Alexander Vinokourov.

Teams

The following teams participated in the 2011 edition of the Critérium International:

UCI ProTour Teams
 
 
 
 
 
 
 
 
 

UCI Professional Continental Teams
 
 
 
 
 
 

UCI Continental Teams

Stages

Stage 1
26 March 2011 – Porto-Vecchio to Col de l'Ospedale, 198 km

Stage 2
27 March 2011 – Porto-Vecchio 75 km

Stage 3
27 March 2011 – Porto-Vecchio 7 km

Classification leadership

References

External links
 https://web.archive.org/web/20111011151515/http://www.letour.fr/us/homepage_courseCRI.html

2011
2011 UCI Europe Tour
2011 in French sport